The GE C32-8 was a 6-axle diesel-electric locomotive model built by GE Transportation Systems in 1984.  It is part of the GE Dash 8 Series of freight locomotives.

Only 10 of these  locomotives were built.  They were some of the first locomotives built in the DASH-8 line with all 10 going to Conrail as road numbers 6610 to 6619.  When delivered they wore the standard Conrail Can Opener (Wheel on Rail) paint scheme.

In 1997 Conrail assigned all 10 units to "Ballast Express" service.  They were repainted into a Gray version of the Quality scheme.

See also
List of GE locomotives

References

External links 
 Photo - as delivered
 Photo - Ballast Express

C32-8
C-C locomotives
Diesel-electric locomotives of the United States
Railway locomotives introduced in 1984
Freight locomotives
Conrail locomotives
Standard gauge locomotives of the United States
Diesel-electric locomotives of Brazil
Standard gauge locomotives of Brazil